Åke Gunnar Rakell (born March 10, 1935) is a male former Swedish international table tennis player.

Table tennis career
He won a bronze medal in doubles with Hans Alsér at the a 1959 World Table Tennis Championships.

Personal life
His grandson is Rickard Rakell, an ice hockey player in the National Hockey League.

See also
 List of table tennis players
 List of World Table Tennis Championships medalists

References

Swedish male table tennis players
1935 births
Living people
World Table Tennis Championships medalists